Hans van Helden (born 27 April 1948) is a former speed skater, originally competing for the Netherlands, later for France.

Life and career

Despite being a very talented speed skater and having an excellent skating style and technique, Van Helden never won any major international tournaments. However, he did become Dutch Allround Champion twice (1976 and 1977) and he did break two world records. Being the then-current world record holder on the 5,000 m, he "only" finished 3rd on that distance during the 1976 Winter Olympics in Innsbruck, possibly because the ice was in much worse condition during his race than it was when his major rivals (Sten Stensen and Piet Kleine) ran theirs.

In Dutch skating, Van Helden was known as an enfant terrible. His clashes with fellow Dutch skaters, his being fed up with fighting the KNSB (Koninklijke Nederlandsche Schaatsenrijders Bond – the Royal Dutch Skaters Federation), and (in 1980) his marriage to a French skater (Marie-France Vives), led to his naturalisation to French citizenship in December 1981. As a Frenchman, having very little competition from other French skaters, he had no problems qualifying for skating events. This also resulted in a long career as a speed skater and he participated in international competitions until he was 40.

One of his most memorable feats was finishing 4th on the 1,500 m during the 1984 Winter Olympics in Sarajevo, aged 35, and well ahead of his former compatriots, Dutchmen Hilbert van der Duim, Frits Schalij, and Hein Vergeer.

Records

Personal records

Van Helden was number one on the Adelskalender, the all-time allround speed skating ranking, from 13 March 1976 to 25 December 1976 – a total of 287 days. He has an Adelskalender score of 163.047 points.

World records
Over the course of his career, Van Helden skated two world records:

Source: SpeedSkatingStats.com

Tournament overview

 NC = Did not qualify for the final distance; classification calculated from the three shorter distances
 DQ = Disqualified
 DNQ = Did not qualify for the final distance
source:

Medals won

References

 Eng, Trond. All Time International Championships, Complete Results: 1889 – 2002. Askim, Norway: WSSSA-Skøytenytt, 2002.
 Teigen, Magne. Komplette Resultater Internasjonale Mesterskap 1889 – 1989: Menn/Kvinner, Senior/Junior, allround/sprint. Veggli, Norway: WSSSA-Skøytenytt, 1989.

External links
 Hans van Helden at SpeedSkatingStats.com
 The Adelskalender pages maintained by Evert Stenlund

1948 births
Living people
Dutch male speed skaters
French male speed skaters
Olympic speed skaters of France
Olympic speed skaters of the Netherlands
Speed skaters at the 1976 Winter Olympics
Speed skaters at the 1984 Winter Olympics
Speed skaters at the 1988 Winter Olympics
Olympic bronze medalists for the Netherlands
Olympic medalists in speed skating
Medalists at the 1976 Winter Olympics
World Allround Speed Skating Championships medalists
World record setters in speed skating
People from Almkerk
Sportspeople from North Brabant